Live Bait may refer to:

fishing bait
live food
Live Bait (album), an album by The Arrogant Worms
Live Bait (film), a film by Bruce Sweeney
Live Bait (novel), a novel by P. J. Tracy
"Live Bait" (The Walking Dead), an episode of the television series The Walking Dead